Kheshti Jan (also Romanized as Kheshtī Jān; also known as Khistijān) is a village in Hamzehlu Rural District, in the Central District of Khomeyn County, Markazi Province, Iran. At the 2006 census, its population was 103, in 32 families.

References 

Populated places in Khomeyn County